The Powderhorn Wilderness is a  wilderness area in Hinsdale and Gunnison counties, Colorado, United States, located  northeast of Lake City.

Description
Most of the northern part of the wilderness area, about 77.5%, is located on Bureau of Land Management land and its southern portion, about 22.5%, is located within the Gunnison National Forest.

The Powderhorn is an important watershed for the Gunnison River. The area protects the East, Middle, and West forks of Powderhorn Creek, which merge and then have a confluence with Cebolla Creek. Calf Creek, which is on National Forest land flows south and eventually joins the Lake Fork Gunnison River that also flows into the Gunnison via Lake City. Within the area there are numerous small lakes and beaver ponds. The largest of these are Devil's Lake and Powderhorn Lake.

Geology

The Powderhorn Wilderness is within the San Juan volcanic field and volcanic rocks dominate the region. The central, highest terrain of the wilderness is composed of basaltic lava flows of the Hinsdale Formation, which are dated at 16 to 19 million years old. These lava flows are thought to be among the last volcanic events in the area and are some of the best preserved. The Hinsdale Formation lava flows form an expansive alpine highland where the two highest ridges are Calf Creek Plateau and Cannibal Plateau. 

Underlying these basalt flows are sheets of older volcanic rocks that are exposed around the periphery of the wilderness. From youngest to oldest, these rocks include Cochetopa Park Tuff, Nelson Mountain Tuff, Carpenter Ridge Tuff, and Fish Canyon Tuff. The volcanic ash that formed these tuffs came from Oligocene eruptions within the San Juan volcanic field. These eruption sites are the Cochetopa Caldera, San Luis Caldera, Bachelor Caldera, and La Garita Caldera, respectively. On the northern and western reaches of the wilderness there are yet older volcanic rocks exposed. These Oligocene lavas and breccias have been dated at 32 million years old.

The Powderhorn Wilderness was glaciated, and the most prominent glacial cirques are located on the north side of the wilderness. Powderhorn Lakes, popular hiking destinations, are located in one of these cirques.

Flora and fauna

Half of the Powderhorn Wilderness is above tree line and the alpine tundra here is dominated by grasses and forbs, though there are also extensive thickets of willow. Below, the  subalpine forest is dominated by  Engelmann spruce and  subalpine fir, and interspersed are numerous subalpine meadows of grasses and forbs. There are also stands of  aspen. At lower elevations, particularly in the northern extension of the wilderness, montane forests occur and  ponderosa pine is often dominate. Sagebrush steppe becomes increasingly common at lower elevations, particularly on drier hillsides.

The wilderness serves as important summer range for mule deer and elk. Other mammals include  mountain lions,  black bears, bobcats, coyotes,  martens,  marmots, and  pikas.

Hiking

Travel through the wilderness is limited to those on foot and horseback. There are six trailheads that provide access to the wilderness. To the west is the Devils Creek Trailhead. Along the north and northeast boundary are the Powderhorn Lake and Ten Mile Spring trailheads. And to the south are the Deer Lakes, Brush Creek, and Powderhorn Park  trailheads.

The most popular destination in the wilderness is Powderhorn Lakes. These two lakes are nestled  in a beautiful glacial cirque, and the  trip one-way is well worth the effort. Start at the Powderhorn Lake Trailhead and take the well-maintained Powderhorn Lakes Trail south to the lakes. Given the popularity of this trail, those seeking remoteness and more solitude may find other trails and destinations more rewarding.

See also

References

External links

Protected areas of Gunnison County, Colorado
Protected areas of Hinsdale County, Colorado
Wilderness areas of Colorado
Bureau of Land Management areas in Colorado
Protected areas established in 1993
Gunnison National Forest
1993 establishments in Colorado